The 2017–18 Turkish Cup was the 56th season of the tournament. Ziraat Bankası is the sponsor of the tournament; thus the official name due to sponsorship was the Ziraat Turkish Cup. As the winners of the tournament, Akhisarspor earned an automatic berth to the group stage of the 2018–19 UEFA Europa League and also qualified for the 2018 Turkish Super Cup.

Competition format 

Source:

First round
 9 Third League and 33 Regional Amateur League teams competed in this round. No seeds were applied in the single-leg round.
 6 teams (67%) from Third League and 15 teams (45%) from the Regional Amateur League qualified for the next round.
 9 seeded (43%) and 12 unseeded (57%) teams qualified for the next round.
 Biggest upset was Siirt İl Özel İdare (no ranking) eliminating Mardin 47 Spor (ranked 137th).
 Lowest-ranked teams qualifying for the next round were Sinopspor, Kars 36 Spor, Siirt İl Özel İdare and Yüksekova Belediyespor (all with no ranking).
 Highest-ranked team eliminated was Yeni Orduspor (ranked 118th).

|colspan="3" style="background-color:#D0D0D0" align=center|22 August 2017

Source:

Second round 
 51 Third League and 15 Regional Amateur League teams competed in this round. No seeds were applied in the single-leg round.
 29 teams (57%) from the Third League and 4 teams (27%) from the Regional Amateur League qualified for the next round.
 18 seeded (55%) and 15 unseeded (45%) teams qualified for the next round.
 Biggest upset was Sinopspor (no ranking) eliminating Erbaaspor (ranked 79th).
 Lowest-ranked teams qualifying for the next round were Sinopspor and Kars 36 Spor (both with no ranking).
 Highest-ranked team eliminated was Aydınspor 1923 (ranked 74th).

|colspan="3" style="background-color:#D0D0D0" align=center|29 August 2017

|-
|colspan="3" style="background-color:#D0D0D0" align=center|30 August 2017

|-
|colspan="3" style="background-color:#D0D0D0" align=center|31 August 2017

Source:

Third round 
 5 Super League, 18 First League, 36 Second League, 29 Third League and 4 Regional Amateur League teams competed in this round. Seeds were applied in the single-leg round.
 4 teams (80%) from the Super League, 12 teams (67%) from the First League, 18 teams (50%) from the Second League, 10 teams (34%) from the Third League and 2 teams (50%) from the Regional Amateur League qualified for the next round.
 29 seeded (63%) and 17 unseeded (37%) teams qualified for the next round.
 Biggest upset was Kars 36 Spor (no ranking) eliminating Balıkesirspor Baltok (ranked 27th).
 Lowest-ranked team qualifying for the next round was Kars 36 Spor (no ranking).
 Highest-ranked team eliminated was Göztepe (ranked 18th).

|colspan="3" style="background-color:#D0D0D0" align=center|19 September 2017

|-
|colspan="3" style="background-color:#D0D0D0" align=center|20 September 2017

|-
|colspan="3" style="background-color:#D0D0D0" align=center|21 September 2017

Source:

Fourth round 
 12 Super League, 12 First League, 18 Second League, 10 Third League and 2 Regional Amateur League teams competed in this round. Seeds were applied in the single-leg round.
 12 teams (100%) from the Super League, 7 teams (58%) from the First League, 4 teams (22%) from the Second League, 3 teams (30%) from the Third League and 1 team (50%) from the Regional Amateur League qualified for the next round.
 19 seeded (70%) and 8 unseeded (30%) teams qualified for the next round.
 Biggest upset was Kars 36 Spor (no ranking) eliminating Altınordu (ranked 25th).
 Lowest-ranked team qualifying for the next round was Kars 36 Spor (no ranking).
 Highest-ranked team eliminated was Çaykur Rizespor (ranked 19th).

|colspan="3" style="background-color:#D0D0D0" align=center|24 October 2017

|-
|colspan="3" style="background-color:#D0D0D0" align=center|25 October 2017

|-
|colspan="3" style="background-color:#D0D0D0" align=center|26 October 2017

Source:

Fifth round 
 17 Super League, 7 First League, 4 Second League, 3 Third League and 1 Regional Amateur League teams competed in this round. Seeds were applied in the two-leg round.
 12 teams (71%) from the Super League, 3 teams (43%) from the First League and 1 team (25%) from the Second League qualified for the next round.
 12 seeded (75%) and 4 unseeded (25%) teams qualified for the next round.
 Biggest upset was Bucaspor (ranked 61st) eliminating Sivasspor (ranked 16th).
 Lowest-ranked team qualifying for the next round was Bucaspor (ranked 61st).
 Highest-ranked team eliminated was Kasımpaşa (ranked tenth).

Summary table

|-

Source:

First leg

Second leg

Round of 16 
 12 Super League, 3 First League and 1 Second League team competed in this round. Seeds were applied in the two-leg round.
 7 teams (41%) from the Super League and 1 team (14%) from the First League qualified for the next round.
 5 seeded (63%) and 3 unseeded (37%) teams qualified for the next round.
 Biggest upset was Giresunspor (ranked 24th) eliminating İstanbul Başakşehir (ranked second).
 Lowest-ranked team qualifying for the next round was Giresunspor (ranked 24th).
 Highest-ranked team eliminated was İstanbul Başakşehir (ranked second).

Qualified teams
 The draw for the round of 16 took place on 15 December 2017.

Summary table

|-

Source:

First leg

Second leg

Bracket

Quarter-finals 
 Seven Super League and one First League team competed in this round. Seeds were applied in the two-leg round.

Qualified teams
 The draw for the quarter finals and following rounds took place on January 19, 2018.

Summary table

|-

Source:

First leg

Second leg

Semi-finals

Summary table

|-

Source:

First leg

Second leg 

 Fenerbahçe awarded the Tie after Beşiktaş refused to return to the field following an incident in the original game where manager Şenol Güneş was struck on the head with an object, forcing the match to be abandoned. The TFF ordered the remaining 32 minutes to be played behind closed doors, however Beşiktaş refused to travel and after a rejected appeal, did not appear for the rescheduled game. As a result, Beşiktaş were punished by forfeiting all prize money from the competition to the point, and barred from entering the 2018-19 contest.

Final
The final was contested in Diyarbakır as a one-off match. The winning club was awarded a total of 75 medals, along with the Turkish Cup trophy.

Akhisarspor player Muğdat Çelik was selected man of the match.

Top goalscorers

References

External links
 2017-18 Turkish Cup Regulations

2017-18
2017–18 European domestic association football cups
Cup